The Hohe Villerspitze is a mountain, in the Southeastern Sellrain Mountains (Südöstlichen Sellrainer Bergen), a sub-group of the northern Stubai Alps in the Austrian state of Tyrol. The mountain has three tops that, together, form an isolated, massive and prominent rocky summit made of amphibolite. Due to its geographic dominance and easily accessibility the Villerspitze is a fairly frequently visited lookout mountain, but it is not one to be underestimated. A prominent arête runs south from the summit.

Literature and maps 
Walter Klier, Stubaier Alpen, Alpine Club Guide, Munich, 2006, 
Eduard Richter, Die Erschließung der Ostalpen, Vol II, Berlin, Verlag des Deutschen und Oesterreichischen Alpenvereins, 1894
Alpine Club map 1:25,000 series, Sheet 31/2 Stubaier Alpen, Sellrain

External links 

Alpine three-thousanders
Mountains of the Alps
Mountains of Tyrol (state)
Stubai Alps